Tanita Tikaram (born 12 August 1969) is a British pop/folk singer-songwriter.  She achieved chart success with the singles "Twist in My Sobriety" and "Good Tradition" from her 1988 debut album, Ancient Heart.

Background
Tikaram was born in Münster, West Germany, the daughter of an Indo-Fijian British Army officer, Pramod Tikaram, and a Sarawakian Malay mother, Fatimah Rohani. Her father's military career meant that she spent her early life in Germany before moving to Basingstoke, Hampshire, England when she was in her early teens. She is the younger sister of the actor Ramon Tikaram and the great-niece of Sir Moti Tikaram, who was the first Lord Chief Justice of an independent Fiji and the world's longest-serving national ombudsman. She attended Queen Mary's College in Basingstoke.

Career
Tikaram started singing in nightclubs while she was still a teenager and came to the attention of WEA Records. Her debut album, Ancient Heart, produced by Rod Argent and Peter Van Hooke, was released in September 1988 when she was 19 years old. The album's first two singles, "Good Tradition" and "Twist in My Sobriety", became top 10 hits around Europe and the album sold around four million copies worldwide. Both the single "Twist In My Sobriety" and Tikaram were nominated at the 1989 Brit Awards for Best British Single and Female Artist categories respectively.

A quick succession of albums for WEA – The Sweet Keeper (1990), Everybody's Angel (1991), and Eleven Kinds of Loneliness (1992) – did not achieve the same commercial success, with each album selling fewer than the previous one. Her 1992 album Eleven Kinds of Loneliness, which was the first Tikaram fully produced herself, did not chart at all.

Taking a break from the music industry and moving to San Francisco, Tikaram returned in 1995 with the album Lovers in the City, which received better reviews than her previous albums and achieved better sales. Still, it was her last studio album for WEA and her contract was finished in 1996 with the release of the compilation album The Best of Tanita Tikaram.

Signed to Mother Records, Tikaram released The Cappuccino Songs in 1998, and then retired for several years from the music industry, reappearing in 2005 with the album Sentimental, which was released on a French label. In 2012, she released Can't Go Back, her first album in seven years. Since 2013, she has been touring the UK and Europe.

Closer to the People was released on 11 March 2016. In December 2015, Tikaram released a videoclip for the song "Food On My Table", although she stated this was not the first single of the album. The first single, "Glass Love Train", was released on 22 January 2016.

Personal life
Tikaram moved from Basingstoke to the Primrose Hill area of north London when she became famous, and still lives there.

In an interview with Diva, published in 2017, she noted that she had been in a relationship with artist Natacha Horn for the past five years.

Discography

 Ancient Heart (1988)
 The Sweet Keeper (1990)
 Everybody's Angel (1991)
 Eleven Kinds of Loneliness (1992)
 Lovers in the City (1995)
 The Cappuccino Songs (1998)
 Sentimental (2005)
 Can't Go Back (2012)
 Closer to the People (2016)

Awards and nominations 
{| class=wikitable
|-
! Year !! Awards !! Work !! Category !! Result !! Ref.
|-
| rowspan=5|1989
| rowspan=2|MTV Video Music Awards
| rowspan=3|"Twist in My Sobriety"
| Best Female Video
| rowspan=4 
| rowspan=2|
|-
| Best Cinematography
|-
| rowspan=2|Brit Awards
| Best British Single
| rowspan=2|
|-
| rowspan=2|Herself
| Best British Female
|-
| Music & Media Year-End Awards
| Female Artist of the Year
| 
|

Other works

Music
 Harmony vocals on "That's Why I'm Leaving Here" on the 1989 self-titled third album by Brendan Croker and the Five O'Clock Shadows.
 Cover of "Loving You" (Leiber/Stoller), included in the 1990 Elvis tribute album The Last Temptation of Elvis.
 Vocals on "I Never Will Know" (by Tikaram), also a US/Can single, and "Blue Moon" (Rodgers/Hart) on the 1990 Mark Isham album Mark Isham.
 Guest vocals on "It's Too Late" on Nanci Griffith's 1991 album Late Night Grande Hotel.
 Guest vocals on the single "Je Te Voudrai Quand Même" from Pierre Schott's album Le Nouveau Monde, from 1992.
 "Poor Wandering One", a song from Gilbert & Sullivan's "Pirates of Penzance" recorded for a Disney soundtrack and produced by Mark Isham, but unreleased – then intended to be used on the soundtrack of "The Hand That Rocks The Cradle", where another version appears instead – then mentioned to appear as B-side, which hasn't happened.
 Writer of three tracks on the Brontë Brothers 1993 album The Way Through The Woods: "Live A Little More", "Beneath The August Moon" (with Mark Creswell) and "A Winner Too" (with Mark Creswell).
 Writer (with Mark Creswell) of the B-side "Need This Lover Growing" of Brontë Brothers 1993 single "Live A Little More".
 Writer of the re-recorded version of "Live A Little More" by Brontë Brothers, 1994 single.
 Vocals on "Redemption Song (Oh Happy Day)" (Marley/Hawkins) on the 1997 Moodswings album Psychedelicatessen.
 Guest vocals on "I'm Looking Up To You" (also a single in Ireland) on Christie Hennessy's 1995 album Lord of Your Eyes.
 "My Love Tonight" commissioned for the Abitare Il Tempo exhibition in Milan, Italy, and appeared on Tikaram's 1995 album "Lovers in the City".
 Adaptation of the poem "Not Waving but Drowning" by Stevie Smith, commissioned by the BBC for their Texts in Time educational series and released on the 1995 Tikaram single "I Might Be Crying".
 "Have You Lost Your Way?" contributed to Italian exhibition Viaggio di Italia, released in 1995 on the Tikaram single "Wonderful Shadow".
 Duet "Dove Sei" (Prunas/Sabiu/Cola/Tikaram) with Cristiano Prunas, released in Italy in 1997 as single and on the Prunas self-titled album.

Film
 Tikaram has played cameo roles on two films, first on the 1994 lesbian film Erotique, on a segment directed by Monika Treut. She plays a secretary interrupting a sex scene of her boss. She plays a restaurant singer in the 2012 French film Goodbye Morocco. In her scene, she sings the jazz standard "Blue Gardenia".
 Producer of the Jared Katsiane documentary drama Solace, also known as Everyday Is New (similar to a track on her album Sentimental), released 2005.
 "Twist in my Sobriety" features in the film, Bandits and Miami Vice Season 5, Episode 14, "The Lost Madonna".

References

External links

Official website (English language)

1969 births
Living people
English contraltos
English people of Indo-Fijian descent
English people of Malaysian descent
English women singer-songwriters
People from Basingstoke
British folk-pop singers
Naïve Records artists
East West Records artists
British lesbian musicians
Lesbian singers
Lesbian songwriters
English LGBT singers
English LGBT songwriters